Nathan Daniel Modest (born 29 September 1991) is an English footballer, currently playing for Sheffield F.C..

Modest made his Championship debut at the age of 17 when he played in the Football League for Sheffield Wednesday where he made 4 appearances between 2008 and 2011 before later playing for Darlington, Sheffield, Worksop Town and Rainworth Miners Welfare.

Career
He graduated through the Sheffield Wednesday Academy and reserve teams, making his first team debut on 20 December 2008, aged 17 years and 82 days. He has also played for the England Schoolboy team. Modest was called up to the Sheffield Wednesday first team squad for the home match against Bristol City on 13 December 2008 as the team suffered an injury crisis. He was a non-playing substitute for the eventual goalless draw. However, Modest went on to make his debut for Sheffield Wednesday a week later on 20 December, when he started in the 2–0 loss away to Cardiff City. Modest was then a second-half substitute in the home game versus Blackpool on 26 December 2008.

Away from football, he has represented South Yorkshire in Athletics, achieving a time of 12.1 seconds at 100m during competition. He attended Notre Dame High School, Sheffield.

On 14 January 2011 it was announced that Modest was to join Conference side Darlington on loan until the end of the season.

On 18 October 2011 it was announced that Modest had left Sheffield Wednesday by mutual consent, having not played for the club for nearly three years and being unable to play in the Sheffield Wednesday Academy, due to being above age. Exactly a week later, Modest signed for the oldest club in the world – local side Sheffield F.C.

Due to fitness levels, Modest didn't make his debut until 10 December later that year. The game was away to Romulus in which Modest scored on his debut to equalise and gain Sheffield F.C. a 1–1 draw, this was his first career goal aged 20, after a total 17 career appearances.

At the end of his first season with Sheffield F.C. he had helped the club to reach the play-offs in the Northern Premier League Division One South after making 21 appearances and scoring six goals. Unfortunately Sheffield F.C. lost 7–0 away to Ilkeston, with Modest making a substitute appearance.

After spending just one season with Sheffield F.C, Modest joined other local North Nottinghamshire side Worksop Town, after making 22 league appearances for Sheffield F.C. and scoring 6 goals. Modest made his debut for Worksop Town later that same day as Worksop faced Hednesford Town in a mid-week league match. The game finished in a 0–4 victory to Worksop Town, with Modest making his debut as a substitute nine-minutes before the final whistle.

Used as a winger for the team due to his electric pace, Modest's first season with Worksop Town he played fourteen games for the club, twelve of which were league appearances.

In pre-season of the new football season of 2013–14, Nathan Modest was confirmed by Worksop Town manager Mark Shaw to have been sent on loan to Rainworth Miners Welfare. Rainworth MW are a level below Worksop Town sitting at level 8 of the pyramid in the English football league system. Modest went on to play and score on his competitive début for Rainworth MW against Loughborough Dynamo, with his team winning 3–2. Modest signed for Lincoln United in September 2013.

In September 2014, after impressing on trial, he signed for Gloucester City.

Modest signed for Rainworth Miners Welfare FC for the 2017/18 season after returning to the city of Sheffield following 3 years of study at Hartpury University. In his debut season for Rainworth he scored 16 goals in league and cup.

Following a successful campaign at Rainworth Modest signed for Bridlington Town to work with former Sheffield United player Curtis Woodhouse. Playing as a striker, Modest Modest became an immediate success picking up 20 goals for the club.

Style of play
Modest has been described as a quick attacking player who has an eye for goal.

References

External links

1991 births
Living people
Footballers from Sheffield
English footballers
Association football forwards
Sheffield Wednesday F.C. players
Darlington F.C. players
Sheffield F.C. players
Worksop Town F.C. players
Rainworth Miners Welfare F.C. players
Lincoln United F.C. players
Gloucester City A.F.C. players
Hednesford Town F.C. players
AFC Telford United players
Evesham United F.C. players
English Football League players
National League (English football) players
Northern Premier League players
People educated at Notre Dame High School, Sheffield